The 2017–18 Yale Bulldogs Men's ice hockey season was the 123rd season of play for the program and the 57th season in the ECAC Hockey conference. The Bulldogs represented Yale University and were coached by Keith Allain, in his 12th season.

Season
Yale played up and down all season long, hovering around the .500 mark. Redshirt sophomore Corbin Kaczperski got some playing time in goal at the end of Yale's 5-game losing streak and the team began to rotate their goaltenders thereafter. The team showed modest improvement as the season went along and entered the conference tournament with a home date in the first round. Unfortunately, the team faltered against Quinnipiac and lost both of their postseason games.

Departures

Recruiting

Roster

Standings

Schedule and results

|-
!colspan=12 style="color:white; background:#00356B" | Exhibition

|-
!colspan=12 style="color:white; background:#00356B" | Regular Season

|-
!colspan=12 style="color:white; background:#00356B" | 

|-
!colspan=12 style="color:white; background:#00356B" | 

|- align="center" bgcolor="#e0e0e0"
|colspan=12|Yale Lost Series 0–2

Scoring statistics

Goaltending statistics

Rankings

*USCHO did not release a poll in week 1.

Awards and honors

ECAC Hockey

Players drafted into the NHL

2018 NHL Entry Draft

† incoming freshman

References

Yale Bulldogs men's ice hockey seasons
Yale Bulldogs
Yale Bulldogs
Yale Bulldogs men's ice hockey
Yale Bulldogs men's ice hockey